Huleh may refer to:
Hula Valley, Israel
Huleh, Iran (disambiguation), places in Iran